The African-American Catholic Congregation and its Imani Temples are a Christian denomination founded in 1989 by the Reverend George Augustus Stallings, Jr., a former American Catholic priest, in Washington, D.C.

In 2014, it decided to relocate to nearby Prince George's County, Maryland; their current headquarters are located in Hillcrest Heights, Maryland.

History
George Augustus Stallings, Jr., then a priest of the Roman Catholic Archdiocese of Washington, founded the Imani Temple African-American Catholic Congregation as a single congregation in Washington, D.C. on July 2, 1989. He named it "Imani" for the Swahili word , meaning "faith". It was an independent church for people who favored an Afrocentric but quasi-Catholic worship style. Within a few months, Imani Temple attracted ex-Catholic and ex-Protestant followers and former Roman Catholic clergy. It grew to a group of nine churches in several cities. Later it expanded to include 13 churches.

In 1989, The Washington Post reported that a former altar boy at St. Teresa of Avila Church accused Stallings of sexual misconduct over a period of several months in 1977. Stallings said "I am innocent," declining to answer questions. The Post had also reported allegations of abuse by two unnamed former altar boys. In a follow-up series of three articles in 1990, Post reporters Bill Dedman and Laura Sessions Stepp reported that concerns about Stallings's association with teenage boys had contributed to his split with the Roman Catholic Church. Stallings's former pastoral assistant, who was 22 at the time, spoke publicly about having had a two-year sexual relationship with him. In 2009 the archdiocese reached a $125,000 settlement with Gamal Awad, who said he was sexually abused at 14 by Stallings and a seminarian.

In 1994, the Imani Temple African American Catholic Congregation, purchased the former Eastern Presbyterian Church, designed by noted Washington architect Appleton P. Clark Jr. and opened in 1893.

In 2001 Stallings, then 53, married a 24-year-old woman from Okinawa in a New York ceremony officiated by the Rev. Sun Myung Moon of the Unification Church.
 
In 2006, the excommunicated former Catholic archbishop Emmanuel Milingo (who married a woman from South Korea in 2001 at the same ceremony as Stallings) performed a conditional consecration for Stallings and three other married independent Catholic bishops at the Imani Temple church in Washington.

In 2014, they decided to relocate to Prince George's County, Maryland, and hence sold the Imani Temple in Washington to property developers. It was renovated and adapted for sale as six luxury condominiums.

Practice
Imani Temple teaching, in contrast to Catholic teaching, allows women to be ordained.  Unlike the Latin Catholic Church, it does not as a rule require celibacy of its priests. In 1991, their first female priest was ordained.

See also
 George Augustus Stallings, Jr.

References

External links
 Imani Temple website

African-American history of Washington, D.C.
Christian organizations established in 1989
Independent Catholic denominations
Christian denominations established in the 20th century
Churches in Washington, D.C.
Capitol Hill
African-American Roman Catholicism
1989 establishments in Washington, D.C.